Budha or Buda is a surname found in Nepal. Budha was an ancient title for a Paikela (warrior) in the Khasa kingdom. The title has been adapted as family name by Khas and Magar ethnicities. Notable people with the surname include:
Hari Budha Magar, Nepalese sportsman
Harsha Bahadur Budha Magar, Nepalese scholar from Magar ethnicity
Raj Bahadur Buda Chhetri, Nepalese politician
Raj Bahadur Budha, Nepalese politician
Yagya Bahadur Budha Chhetri, Nepalese politician

References

Khas surnames
Nepali-language surnames